Look Before You Love is a 1948 British drama film directed by Harold Huth and starring Margaret Lockwood, Griffith Jones and Maurice Denham.

Plot summary
A woman working in the British Embassy in Brazil falls in love and marries a man, but soon discovers him to be a drunken wastrel tied up with serious crime. He tries to get her to marry a dying millionaire so he can remarry her.

Cast
 Margaret Lockwood as Ann Markham
 Griffith Jones as Charles Kent
 Norman Wooland as Ashley Morehouse
 Phyllis Stanley as Bettina Colby
 Maurice Denham as Fosser
 Frederick Piper as Miller
 Bruce Seton as Johns
 Michael Medwin as Emile Garat
 Violet Farebrother as Dowager
 Peggy Evans as Typist

Production
The film was originally known as I Know You and Change of Heart. Margaret Lockwood had been arguing with the Rank Organisation over what films she should make, and had gone on suspension for refusing Roses on Her Pillow, but agreed to do this. 

Filming started on 15 March 1948 and took place at Denham Studios under the title Change of Heart. Star Griffith Jones recalled "We hoped for a comedy of wit, and style but it wasn't to be."

Critical reception
In a contemporary review, Variety called the film "an overlong and somewhat corny love story that gives Margaret Lockwood a sympathetic role after her many Wicked Lady characterisations, in which she has been so successfully typed in the past", adding, "it may gratify the out-of-town popular audiences, but its chances of success in any metropolis are scant"; while more recently, TV Guide rated the film two out of five stars, dismissing it as a "Ridiculous story played straight; as a farce it might have had some chance."

The film generally received poor reviews. According to Lockwood's biographer "Few British films of the 1940s received a more devastating barrage of criticism than Look Before You Love when it was released in October 1948."

The film's failure contributed to the decline in Lockwood's popularity.

The film was released by Eagle Lion in the US in 1950. It was released without a certificate from the PCA because it thought the film breached it basic theme and detail.

References

Bibliography

External links

Look Before Your Love at TCMDB
Review of film at Variety

1948 films
1948 drama films
Films directed by Harold Huth
British drama films
British black-and-white films
1940s English-language films
1940s British films